Ismael Urzaiz Aranda (born 7 October 1971) is a Spanish former footballer who played as a centre-forward.

Best known for his physical strength and aerial ability, the unsuccessful youth graduate at Real Madrid went on to represent seven other teams during his extensive professional career, mainly Athletic Bilbao where he spent 11 years. Over 16 seasons, he amassed La Liga totals of 445 matches and 131 goals (61 headers, record of the competition). 

Urzaiz appeared 25 times for Spain, representing the national team at Euro 2000.

Club career

Real Madrid
Born in Tudela, Navarre, Urzaiz began his professional career at Real Madrid's reserves, joining the youth system from local CD Tudelano in 1985 and making his debut in Segunda División four years later. Despite being a successful youth international, he did not make any La Liga appearances for the first team (however, he did play one game against Danish club Odense Boldklub, in the 1990–91 European Cup).

Urzaiz spent the 1991–92 season on loan at Albacete Balompié, making his top-flight debut when he came on as a substitute in a 4–0 home win against Athletic Bilbao on 20 October 1991. In early 1993, he was loaned to Celta de Vigo in the same league.

Professional journeyman
Urzaiz left Real Madrid permanently in 1993, and in the following three seasons he played for Rayo Vallecano, UD Salamanca and RCD Espanyol – with a very modest scoring rate in the first two sides. He helped Salamanca win promotion to the top tier in 1995, scoring twice as they beat Albacete 5–0 in the play-offs.

The following campaign, Urzaiz joined Espanyol for 35 million pesetas and exploded as a first-rate attacking player, netting 13 league goals for a side that eventually finished fourth, including a hat-trick against former club Rayo Vallecano for a 4–2 home victory on 14 April 1996.

Athletic Bilbao
The form of a revived Urzaiz attracted interest and in the summer of 1996 he joined Athletic Bilbao for a 500 million pesetas fee, being eligible for the all-Basque team having been born in Navarre. In 11 seasons, he scored 115 goals in 367 league appearances. In 1997–98, his eight successful strikes in 32 matches helped to a runner-up finish, which led to direct qualification for the UEFA Champions League, where he scored once in seven games.

Urzaiz scored in double figures in six of his campaigns at the San Mamés Stadium, but the emergence of youth graduate Fernando Llorente (even taller at ) prompted his exit from the club in July 2007; he still featured in 35 competitive matches in his final year, coincidentally also his age by its end, but only completed the 90 minutes in six of them. 

As well as being only the 14th player (at that point) to pass 400 appearances for Athletic, Urzaiz's total of 419 games set a club record for a player from Navarre which stood until 2020 when overtaken by Iker Muniain.

Ajax
On 19 July 2007, Urzaiz signed a one-year contract with AFC Ajax, joining fellow Spaniards Gabri and Albert Luque. He made his official debut on 15 August, in the Champions League qualifier against Slavia Prague (1–0 home loss, 18 minutes played).

Urzaiz was released by the Amsterdam club after just three Eredivisie appearances, announcing his retirement at nearly 37 shortly afterwards.

International career
Urzaiz represented Spain at the 1988 UEFA European Under-16 Championship in Denmark, helping his country to win the tournament. He also scored four goals for the under-20 team at the 1991 FIFA World Youth Championship, held in Portugal.

On 10 October 1996, Urzaiz made his debut for the senior side, a 0–0 away draw with the Czech Republic for the 1998 FIFA World Cup qualifiers. Over the next three years he made only three more appearances and failed to score, but emerged as the hero as Spain qualified for UEFA Euro 2000, netting six times in three games – this included two against Austria and a hat-trick against Cyprus. After a further two in a friendly with Poland, he was subsequently picked for the final stages in Belgium and the Netherlands.

After 25 caps and eight goals, Urzaiz made his last international appearance in a 3–0 friendly loss to England, in Birmingham in 2001. Between 1997 and 2005 he also played seven times for the Basque Country representative team, scoring twice in a 3–2 win over Morocco in 2000.

Career statistics

Club

International goals
Scores and results list Spain's goal tally first, score column indicates score after each Urzaiz goal.

Honours
Spain U16
UEFA European Under-16 Championship: 1988

Individual
FIFA U-20 World Cup: silver shoe: 1991

See also
 List of Athletic Bilbao players (+200 appearances)
 List of La Liga players (400+ appearances)

References

External links

1971 births
Living people
People from Tudela, Navarre
Spanish footballers
Footballers from Navarre
Association football forwards
La Liga players
Segunda División players
Segunda División B players
Real Madrid Castilla footballers
Real Madrid CF players
Albacete Balompié players
RC Celta de Vigo players
Rayo Vallecano players
UD Salamanca players
RCD Espanyol footballers
Athletic Bilbao footballers
Eredivisie players
AFC Ajax players
Spain youth international footballers
Spain under-21 international footballers
Spain under-23 international footballers
Spain international footballers
UEFA Euro 2000 players
Basque Country international footballers
Spanish expatriate footballers
Expatriate footballers in the Netherlands
Spanish expatriate sportspeople in the Netherlands